This is a list of the first minority male lawyer(s) and judge(s) in South Carolina. It includes the year in which the men were admitted to practice law (in parentheses). Also included are men who achieved other distinctions such becoming the first in their state to graduate from law school or become a political figure.

Firsts in South Carolina's history

Lawyers 

 First African American male: Jonathan Jasper Wright (1867) 
 First African American male to practice before the South Carolina Supreme Court: Arthur Chester Platt (1922)

State judges 

 First African American male (judicial officer): Samuel B. Thompson around 1868 
 First African American male (South Carolina Supreme Court): Jonathan Jasper Wright (1867) in 1870  
 First African American male (judge): Richard E. Fields (1948) 
 First African American male (probate court): Bernard R. Fielding Sr. in 1976  
 First African American male elected (probate court): Harry C. Brown (1987) in 1987
 First African American male (South Carolina Supreme Court; since Reconstruction): Ernest A. Finney Jr. (1954) in 1985

Federal judges 
First African American male (U.S. District Court for the District of South Carolina): Matthew J. Perry (1959) in 1979

South Carolina Bar Association 

 First African American male president: I. S. Leevy Johnson (1968) in 1985

Firsts in local history 

 Burnele Venable Powell: First Black male to serve as the Dean of the University of South Carolina School of Law (2003) [Lexington and Richland Counties, South Carolina]
 Bernard R. Fielding Sr.: First African American male probate judge in Charleston County, South Carolina (1990)
 Donald J. Sampson: First African American male lawyer in Greenville County, South Carolina
 Harry C. Brown (1987): First African American male elected as a probate judge in Jasper County, South Carolina (1987)
 Luther Battiste III: First Black male to serve as President of the Richland County Bar Association
 J.W. Johnes: First African American male to serve as a Justice of the Peace in Spartanburg, Spartanburg County, South Carolina
 Matthew J. Perry (1959): First African American male lawyer in Spartanburg, Spartanburg County, South Carolina
 Albert Smith: First Black male to serve as President of Spartanburg County Bar Association

See also 

 List of first minority male lawyers and judges in the United States

Other topics of interest 

 List of first women lawyers and judges in the United States
 List of first women lawyers and judges in South Carolina

References 

 
Minority, South Carolina, first
Minority, South Carolina, first
Legal history of South Carolina
Lists of people from South Carolina
South Carolina lawyers